Stephen V. Marks (born 1958) is an American economist who specializes in the economy of Indonesia. He is the Elden Smith Professor of Economics at Pomona College, and the coordinator of the college's international relations program.

He is the father of Andrew Marks, and is married to Litha Marks.

References

American economists
1958 births
Pomona College faculty
Living people
Indonesianists